The 2010 Taça da Liga Final was the third of the Taça da Liga competition in Portugal. The final was played at the Estádio Algarve in Faro on 21 March 2010 and marked the third time that the final has been staged at the stadium since the competition began. The match opposed two teams of the Big Three, S.L. Benfica and FC Porto. The last time this two teams met in any Portuguese final was at the 2004 Taça de Portugal final, also won by Benfica.

Background
Benfica went into the match as the Portuguese League Cup title holder, as they having previously won in 2009, while this was the first time for Porto in the final.

Route to the final

Note: In all results below, the score of the finalist is given first (H: home; A: away).

Match

Summary

First half
Benfica controlled the first half of the game hence, scoring two goals. The first goal was scored by Rúben Amorim and it was a low, long-range effort that the goalkeeper parried into the net. The second goal was a long-range free kick scored by Carlos Martins.

Second half
Óscar Cardozo scored the third after Rúben Amorim hit the post.

Details

References

External links 
Official site
Official regulation 
Official Statistics 

2010
Taca da Liga
S.L. Benfica matches
FC Porto matches